Klaartje is a given name. Notable people with the name include:

Klaartje Liebens (born 1995), Belgian tennis player
Klaartje Quirijns (born 1967), Dutch film and television director and producer

Feminine given names